The 2004–05 Drexel Dragons men's basketball team represented Drexel University during the 2004–05 NCAA Division I men's basketball season. The Dragons, led by 4th year head coach Bruiser Flint, played their home games at the Daskalakis Athletic Center and were members of the Colonial Athletic Association.

Roster

Schedule

|-
!colspan=9 style="background:#F8B800; color:#002663;"| Regular season
|-

|-
!colspan=9 style="background:#F8B800; color:#002663;"| CAA Regular Season

|-
!colspan=9 style="background:#F8B800; color:#002663;"| CAA tournament

|-
!colspan=9 style="background:#F8B800; color:#002663;"| National Invitation Tournament

Awards
Chaz Crawford
CAA All-Defensive Team

Phil Goss
CAA All-Conference Second Team
CAA Player of the Week

Bashir Mason
CAA All-Defensive Team
CAA Player of the Week

References

Drexel Dragons men's basketball seasons
Drexel
Drexel
2004 in sports in Pennsylvania
2005 in sports in Pennsylvania